RER Fribourg or RER Fribourg | Freiburg is an S-Bahn network in the canton of Fribourg in Switzerland.

History 

The RER Fribourg network began operation with the 11 December 2011 timetable change. As part of the new service, eight stations on the line closed. These improvements were known collectively as "RER Sud" (south). In addition, the frequency of the RegioExpress service between Fribourg and Bern became hourly.

With the December 2014 timetable change, S-Bahn-style "S" designations were applied for the first time:

 S50 / S51: the existing half-hourly RER Fribourg service between Palézieux and Châtel-St-Denis, with S50 trains continuing every hour to Bulle.
 S52: an existing weekday rush-hour service between Châtel-St-Denis and Bulle.
 S60: the existing hourly RER Fribourg service between Broc and Montbovon.

Thus paired with the S20, this created a half-hourly schedule between Fribourg and Ins. The RER Sud portion of the network was simplified: the S51 and S52 were eliminated, with the S50 running on an hourly schedule between Palézieux and Montbovon. The hourly S60 was extended from Bulle to Palézieux on peak periods, combining with the S50 for half-hourly service.

The 2017 changes to the southern part of the network were largely reversed in December 2019, with the S50 and S60 again terminating at Bulle. The S51 returned as an hourly service between Bulle and Montbovon. Once complete, trains could run through from Fribourg to Broc via Bulle.

In December 2021, the S20 and S21 were extended south from Fribourg to Romont, replacing the S40.

Lines 
 the network consists of the following lines:

 : ––––
 : Broc-Fabrique–Bulle–Romont–Fribourg–
 : –––Fribourg–Romont
 : Ins–Murten/Morat–Fribourg–Romont
 : –––Fribourg
 : ––Bulle–
 : Palézieux–Châtel-St-Denis–Bulle–

All trains are operated by Transports publics Fribourgeois except for the S30, which Swiss Federal Railways operates.

References

External links 
 

Fribourg
Transport in the canton of Fribourg